The Vickers Valentia (company designation Type 264) was a British biplane bomber transport aircraft built by Vickers for the Royal Air Force. The majority built were conversions of the earlier Vickers Victoria, itself derived from the Vickers Virginia.

Design and development
While the Napier Lion-powered Victoria served successfully with the RAF as a bomber transport, by 1932, the Lion engine was becoming obsolete and it was clear that it could use more power. It was therefore decided to re-engine the aircraft with more powerful Bristol Pegasus engines. It was decided to carry out a two-stage upgrade, with the first, designated the Victoria Mk VI or Configuration I, having a limited maximum weight. This was followed by Configuration 2 which was capable of taking full advantage of the greater power of the Pegasus engine by virtue of a strengthened airframe featuring a strengthened wing, strut rather than wire-braced landing gear, wheel brakes and a tailwheel in place of a skid. This became the Vickers Valentia Mk I which flew for the first time in 1934.

Orders were placed for the 28 new build Valentias to Specification 30/34, with a further 54 being converted from Victorias (Type 278 within the company), with production continuing until 1936.

In 1938 a version with Pegasus IIM3 engines (which offered improved 'hot and high' performance) was supplied for service with one flight of No. 31 Squadron then based in Lahore.

Operational history
The Valentia first entered service with No. 70 Squadron RAF at Hinaidi, Iraq in 1934, equipping British forces in India, Persia and Iraq.

Like the preceding Vernons and Victorias, the Valentias were extensively used for transport operations in the Middle East, and when necessary used for bombing operations with bomb racks under the wings. Valentias were also experimentally fitted with loudspeakers used to address people being overflown (in this case potentially rebellious tribes during air policing duties). The Valentia was also used for experiments with aerial refuelling by Alan Cobham.

Valentias were used for night bombing operations over the Western Desert in 1940. In service with No. 31 Squadron RAF and the RAF Communications Flight Iraq, they took part in the 1941  Siege of RAF Habbaniya and subsequent operations. They then remained in service with the Communications Flight Iraq (later Iraq & Persia) until 1944. The South African Air Force pressed a Valentia into service as a bomber in the East African Campaign in 1940–41.

The Valentia was replaced as a transport in RAF service by the Bristol Bombay.

Variants
 Valentia Mk I : Military transport aircraft for the RAF.

Operators

Royal Indian Air Force

 South African Air Force

 Royal Air Force
 No. 31 Squadron RAF
 No. 70 Squadron RAF
 No. 216 Squadron RAF
 Communication Flight Iraq

Specifications (Valentia Mk. I)

See also

References

Bibliography

 
 

1930s British military transport aircraft
Type 264 Valentia
Biplanes
Twin piston-engined tractor aircraft